VNN is a venture capital and private equity company belonging to Votorantim Group. The company is based in São Paulo, Brazil and currently has investments in eight companies: Amyris Biotech, Anfreixo, Base Metals, Moksha8, Nitro Química, Quadrem and SAM.

The company invests in companies in early stage of development with high growth potential and also in more mature businesses, where value creation stems from the renewal of the operating model or business.

VNN has experience in business structuring, mergers and acquisitions, practice in strategic management, financial, operational and human resources and expertise of business sectors such as life sciences, technology services and mineral exploration.

References 

Companies established in 1996
Venture capital firms
Votorantim Group
Private equity firms of Brazil